This is a timeline documenting the events of heavy metal in the year 2000.

Newly formed bands
5ive
A Perfect Murder
 Adagio
 Adema
Alcest
Alove for Enemies
Angelus Apatrida
Animosity
The Answer
Antigama
 Apostasy
 Arsis
 As I Lay Dying
 Beto Vázquez Infinity
Between the Buried and Me
Beyond the Embrace
Bucovina
Byzantine
Cannae
Car Bomb 
Circus Maximus 
 Crashdïet
The Darkness
Deadsoul Tribe
Deathstars
Debauchery
Demon Hunter
 Disarmonia Mundi
 Forever Slave
 From Autumn to Ashes
 Full Blown Chaos
 Hammers of Misfortune
 Hatesphere
 Hurt
 Indukti
 Kiuas
 Machinae Supremacy
 Majesty
 Mar de Grises
 Mastodon
 Mgła
 Mirrorthrone
 Mystic Prophecy
 Nachtmystium
 Nightrage
 The Ocean 
 Ondskapt 
 Otep
 Pagan's Mind
 Pantheist
 Peste Noire
 Place of Skulls
 Planet X 
 Poisonblack 
 Shaaman
 Seventh Wonder
 Steel Panther
 Swallow the Sun
 Sylosis
 Thunderstone
 Ulcerate
 Ünloco
 The Vision Bleak
 Visions of Atlantis
 Warmen
 Witchcraft

Reformed bands
 Britny Fox
 Living Colour

Sorted Albums

January

February

March

April

May

June

July

September

October

November

December

Unsorted Albums

 Downset. – Check Your People
 Edguy – The Savage Poetry (re-recording)
 Fates Warning – Disconnected
 Glassjaw – Everything You Ever Wanted to Know About Silence
 Godflesh – Messiah (EP)
 Godsmack – Awake
 Halford – Resurrection
 HammerFall – Renegade
 Heaven Shall Burn – Asunder
 Helloween – The Dark Ride
 The Hives – Veni Vidi Vicious
 Immolation – Close to a World Below
 Incantation – The Infernal Storm
 In Flames – Clayman
 Iron Maiden – Brave New World
 Isis – Celestial
 Jag Panzer – Thane to the Throne
 Killswitch Engage – Killswitch Engage
 King Diamond – House of God
 King's X – Please Come Home... Mr. Bulbous
 Lamb of God – New American Gospel
 Limp Bizkit – Chocolate Starfish and the Hot Dog Flavored Water
 Linkin Park – Hybrid Theory
 Madball – Hold It Down
 Marilyn Manson – Holy Wood (In the Shadow of the Valley of Death)
 Metalium – State of Triumph – Chapter Two
 Misanthrope – Misanthrope Immortel
 Misanthrope – Recueil d'Écueils: les Épaves et Autres Oeuvres Interdites (compilation)
 Morbid Angel – Gateways to Annihilation
 Monster Magnet – God Says No
 Motörhead – We Are Motörhead
 Mötley Crüe – New Tattoo
 Mudvayne – L.D. 50
 Nasum – Human 2.0
 Nevermore – Dead Heart in a Dead World
 Nightwish – Wishmaster
 Nile – Black Seeds of Vengeance
 Nothingface – Violence
 No-Big-Silence – Successful, Bitch & Beautiful
 One Minute Silence – Buy Now... Saved Later
 Orange Goblin – The Big Black
 Origin – Origin
 Overkill – Bloodletting
 Papa Roach – Infest
 Paul Di'Anno – Nomad
 Pig Destroyer – 7" Picture Disc (EP)
 Pig Destroyer – Isis / Pig Destroyer (split EP)
 Pitchshifter – Deviant
 Poison – Power to the People
 Pro-Pain – Round 6
 QueenAdreena – Taxidermy
 Racer X – Technical Difficulties (Europe and US versions)
 Raised Fist – Ignoring the Guidelines
 Rhapsody – Dawn of Victory
 Rob Rock – Rage of Creation
 Rotting Christ - Khronos
 Saxon – Burrn! Presents: The Best of Saxon (compilation)
 Scorpions – Moment of Glory (compilation)
 Scarve – Translucence
 Seven Witches – City of Lost Souls
 Shadows Fall – Of One Blood
 Shuvel – Set It Off
 Sinergy – To Hell and Back
 Ska-P – Planeta Eskoria
 Soulfly – Primitive
 Soulreaper - Written in Blood
 Static-X – The Death Trip Continues (EP)
 Stratovarius – 14 Diamonds (compilation)
 Suicidal Tendencies – Free Your Soul and Save My Mind
 Symphony X – V: The New Mythology Suite
 Tad Morose – Undead
 Theatre of Tragedy – Musique
 The Chasm – Procession to the Infraworld
 The Haunted – Made Me Do It
 The Sins of Thy Beloved – Perpetual Desolation
 Trail of Tears – Profoundemonium
 Underoath – Cries of the Past
 Virgin Steele – The House of Atreus Act II
 Within Temptation – Mother Earth
 Whispering Gallery – Like a Dream of Never-ending Beauty... Love Never Dies
 Yngwie Malmsteen – War to End All Wars

Disbandments
 Rage Against the Machine
 Sacred Reich (Reformed 2006)

Events
 Al Pitrelli replaces Marty Friedman on guitar for Megadeth.
 Metallica releases a song "I Disappear" that was never released on any studio albums and appears on the Mission: Impossible 2 soundtrack. This song also started the famous Napster Controversy.
 Angela Gossow replaces Johan Liiva on vocals for Arch Enemy.
 Mr. Bungle play their final concert.

References

2000s in heavy metal music
Metal
20th century in heavy metal music